A figurehead is a carved wooden decoration found at the bow of ships, generally of a design related to the name or role of a ship. They were predominant between the 16th and 20th centuries, and modern ships' badges fulfil a similar role.

History

Although earlier ships had often had some form of bow ornamentation (e.g. the eyes painted on the bows of Greek and Phoenician galleys, the Roman practice of putting carvings of their deities on the bows of their galleys, and the Viking ships of ca. A.D. 800–1100), the general practice was introduced with the galleons of the 16th century, as the figurehead as such could not come to be until ships had an actual stemhead structure on which to place it. The menacing appearance of toothy and bug-eyed figureheads on Viking ships were considered a form of apotropaic magic, serving the function of warding off evil spirits. The Egyptians placed figures of holy birds on the prow while the Phoenicians used horses representing speed. The Ancient Greeks used boars' heads to symbolise acute vision and ferocity while Roman boats often mounted a carving of a centurion representing valour in battle. In northern Europe, serpents, bulls, dolphins and dragons were customary and by the 13th Century, the swan was used representing grace and mobility.

In Germany, Belgium and the Netherlands, it was once believed that spirits/faeries called Kaboutermannekes (gnomes, little men, faeries) dwelt in the figureheads. The spirit guarded the ship from sickness, rocks, storms, and dangerous winds. If the ship sank, the Kaboutermannekes guided the sailors' souls to the Land of the Dead. To sink without a Kaboutermanneke condemned the sailor's soul to haunt the sea forever, so Dutch sailors believed. A similar belief was found in early Scandinavia/Vikings.

In pre-colonial Burma, during the Konbaung dynasty, figureheads were used to distinguish several types of royal barges allocated to different members of the royal court; each barge had a specific mythical figurehead at the front.

During the period from the 17th to the 18th centuries the carved subjects of figureheads varied from representations of saints to patriotic emblems such as the unicorns or lions popular on English ships. When the ship was named after a royal or naval personage the head and bust of the individual might be shown.

As with the stern ornamentation, the purpose of the figurehead was often to indicate the name of the ship in a non-literate society (albeit in a sometimes very convoluted manner); and always, in the case of naval ships, to demonstrate the wealth and might of the owner. At the height of the Baroque period, some ships boasted gigantic figureheads, weighing several tons and sometimes twinned on both sides of the bowsprit.

A large figurehead, being carved from massive wood and perched on the very foremost tip of the hull, adversely affected the sailing qualities of the ship. This, and cost considerations, led to figureheads being made dramatically smaller during the 18th century, and in some cases they were abolished altogether around 1800. After the Napoleonic wars they made something of a comeback, but were then often in the form of a small waist-up bust rather than the oversized full figures previously used. The clipper ships of the 1850s and 1860s customarily had full figureheads, but these were relatively small and light.

Decline in use 

Figureheads as such died out with the military sailing ship. In addition the vogue for ram bows meant that there was no obvious place to mount one on battleships. Smaller ships of the Royal Navy continued to carry them. The last example may well have been the sloop  launched in 1903. Early steamships sometimes had gilt scroll-work and coats-of-arms at their bows. This practice lasted up until about World War I. The 1910 German liner  originally sported a large bronze figurehead of an eagle (the Imperial German symbol) standing on a globe. The few extra feet of length added by the figurehead made Imperator the longest ship in the world at the time of her launch.

It is still common practise for warships to carry ships' badges, large plaques mounted on the superstructure with a unique design relating to the ship's name or role. For example, Type 42 destroyers of the Royal Navy, which are named after British cities, carry badges depicting the coat of arms of their namesake.

On smaller vessels, the billethead might be substituted. This was a smaller, nonfigural carving, most often a curl of foliage.

Images

See also
Acrostolium
Hood ornament
Winged victory

References

External links

 The Figurehead Archive
 Telegraph Gallery (17 images)
 History Trust of South Australia
 Figureheads
 The Mariners' Museum Figurehead Collection
 
 Figureheads from the Vestfold Museums's (Norwegian) collections on DigitalMuseum

Further reading

Sailboat components
Sailing ship components